Canada competed at the 2011 Winter Universiade in Erzurum, Turkey. Canada sent a team of 102 athletes and 39 officials.

Alpine skiing

Canada sent 5 male and 6 female athletes for a total of 11.

Men
Christopher Barber
Philippe Crête-Belzile
Olivier Lacaille
Braden Long
Simon Mannella

Women
Maëlle Bergeron
Kendall Brown
Catherine Morel
Rebecca Nadler
Nicole Poleschuk
Marie-France Tessier

Biathlon

Canada's team consisted of 8 athletes.
Men
Jonathan Forward
Alex Frost
Jaime Robb
Jon Skinstad

Women
Lauren Brookes
Elizabeth Mawdsley
Carly Shiell
Kathryn Stone

Cross-country skiing

Canada's team consisted of 10 athletes.
Men
Colin Abbott
Benjamin Hebert
Jesse Heckrodt
Anthony Killick
Vincent Ruel

Women
Adele Lay
Alexia Pichard-Jolicouer
Zoe Roy
Mary Thompson
Maja Zimmermann

Curling

Canada sent a men's and women's team.

Men
Skip: Jonathan Beuk
Third: Andrew Inouye
Second: Chadd Vandermade
Lead: Scott Chadwick
Alternate: Andrew Minty

Standings

Women
Skip: Brooklyn Lemon
Third: Chelsey Peterson 
Second: Ashley Green
Lead: Nicole Lang
Alternate: Sarah Watamanuk

Standings

Ice hockey

Canada sent a men's and women's team.

Men

Group B

Roster
Goalies
Anthony Grieco
Jim Watt

Defense
Scott Aarssen
Marc-André Dorion
Dominic Jalbert
Geoff Killing
Tim Priamo
Jordan Smith
Kyle Sonnenburg

Forwards
Kevin Baker
Matt Caria
Francis Charland
Yashar Farmanara
Thomas Kiriakou
Maxime Langelier-Parent
Brandon MacLean
Chris Ray
Jean-Michel Rizk
Matthieu Methot
Keaton Turkiewicz
Ryan Berard
Evan Vossen

Women

Group A
Six participating teams were placed in one group. After playing a round-robin, the top four teams in each group plus to the Semifinals. The fifth and sixth placed teams played a playoff for fifth place.

Schedule

Semifinals

Finals

The Women's team was the defending champion.

Goalies
Beth Clause
Liz Knox

Defense
Jenna Downey
Suzanne Fenerty
Carly Hill
Caitlin MacDonald
Alicia Martin
Jacalyn Sollis
Kelsey Webster

Forwards
Ann-Sophie Bettez
Vanessa Davidson
Kim Deschênes
Breanne George
Alicia Martin
Jacalyn Sollis
Jocelyn Leblanc
Andrea Ironside
Addie Miles
Mariève Provost
Ellie Seedhouse
Candice Styles
Courtney Unruh
Jessica Zerafa

Short track speed skating

Canada sent 5 male and 5 female athletes for a total of 10.
Men
Gabriel Chiasson-Poirier
Vincent Cournoyer
Allyn Gagnon
Pier-Olivier Gagnon
Liam McFarlane

Women
Sabrina Bourgela
Andréa Do-Duc
Valérie Lambert
Kristy Shoebridge
Gabrielle Waddell

Snowboarding

Canada sent 7 male and 2 female athletes for a total of 9.

Men
Antoine Laurin-Lalonde
Dylan Riley
Frédéric Laurin-Lalonde
Mackenzie Carter
Pierce Smith
Rob Ritchie
Taylor Ronsky

Women
Annfred Grenier
Justine Côté

References

2011 in Canadian sports
Nations at the 2011 Winter Universiade
Canada at the Winter Universiade